Fusarium oxysporum f.sp. pisi is a fungal plant pathogen infecting peas, endemic to Moldova.

External links
 USDA ARS Fungal Database

oxysporum f.sp. pisi
Fungal plant pathogens and diseases
Vegetable diseases
Forma specialis taxa